Sidney or Sydney Harris may refer to:

 Sydney J. Harris, (1917–1986), American journalist
 Sidney Harris (cartoonist), American science cartoonist
 Sydney Harris (All My Children), character in the American television series All My Children
 Sidney Harris, fictional character in the Honorverse science fiction novels by David Weber
 Sir Sidney Harris, President of the British Board of Film Classification from 1948 to 1960
 Sydney Harris (judge), (1917-2009), Canadian judge and civil rights activist.